Business Party may refer to:

Albanian Business Party
Business Party (Faroe Islands)
Political Party of Small and Medium-sized Businesses of Ukraine
South African Business Party
Fake party (Hungary)